Eket is one of the 31 local government areas in Akwa Ibom State, Nigeria. The name Eket or Ekid also refers to the indigenous ethnic group of the region and to their language. The Eket people use the endonym Ekid for themselves and their language, but Europeans spell and pronounce the name as "Eket".

Eket, apart from being a local government area in Akwa Ibom State is one of the three geopolitical zones in the state. The geopolitical zones are, Uyo senatorial district, Ikot Ekpene senatorial district and Eket senatorial district.

The town itself is an industrial city that in recent years has become a conurbation joining together separate villages. The Office of the Surveyor-General of Akwa Ibom State estimates the area of the Eket Local Government Area to be approximately 176.000 square Km while the 2006 National Census gives the population of the Local Government Area as 172,856. However, the Akwa Ibom State Ministry of Economic Development gives the 2013 estimated population of the Eket Local Government Area as given as 218,438 with a population density of 1,241/square Km.

History

Not much has been written about Eket people before the coming of the European missionaries, traders and colonialists. However, Portuguese explorers arrived on the coast of West Africa in the late 1400s and interacted with the natives through trading activities and enslavement of Africans. There is evidence of contact between Eket people and the Portuguese at this time and since.

Some ideas about the history of Eket people before the colonial era can be gleaned from the oral histories of the different Ekid clans. According to the 1956 Jones Report, Eket people acknowledged themselves as belonging to 11 clans. Although Prof. Jones did not mention the names of these 11 clans, they are Afaha (the largest clan), Etebi, Abighe, Idua, Ibeye, Uda, Aniogh, Abikpi, Nnama, Assang and Akiki. Of these 11 clans only Afaha and Idua clans have been recognized as such by the Akwa Ibom State Government while the other 9 clans have been grouped into one recognized clan – Ekid Offiong. Thus we have three recognized Ekid clans, namely Ekid Afaha, Ekid Offiong and Idua clans. The fourth clan in Eket Local Government Area is Okon clan. These different clans of Eket people have their oral histories explaining their origin and migration to their present locations. Common among the oral histories of migration of Eket Afaha and Ekid Offiong clans is the fact that they migrated from Usak Edet (Isangele) in the present-day Cameroon through various routes to their current locations. The Idua people claim they migrated from the Cameroons to Calabar through Northern Cross River before crossing to Esit Eket, Eket and Oron on the mainland. These oral histories seem to confirm the position of several historians such as Abasiattai (1988) and Edet Udoh (1983) that Eket, Oron and Ibeno people migrated through a seaward route from the Cameroons to their current locations.

Although King Jaja's commercial and political adventures in the Qua Iboe area which impacted on the Ekid people have been documented in colonial records, including the 1881 Jaja-Ibeno War it seems the one singular event which brought Eket into history was the signing of the Treaty of friendship and protection between the "King" and Chiefs of Eket, Qua Iboe River and the representatives of Queen Victoria of the United Kingdom of Britain, Ireland, India, etc. at Eket Beach, Atabong ("Esok Akungkpung" or "Esok Afia Anwe") on 8 September 1884. The signatories for Eket were given as Ackpun, Userturo, Uko, Ito and Esiet while R.W. Craigie, commander of Her Majesty's Ship "Flirt" signed for Consul E.H. Hewett, Esq). "Ackpun" was a misspelling of "Akpan", that is, Akpan Udoimuk of Nung Akpan in Atabong Village while "Userturo" was a misspelling of "Uso Etukudo" (Uso Etukudo was of Nung Uso Ekon in Usung Inyang village). The signatories for Eket were village/family heads of the surrounding villages of Atabong and Usung Inyang. The British trader, George Watts, signed as witness. On the same day, similar treaties were signed between the British officials and the "King" and Chiefs of Ibeno at Ibeno Beach and the "King" and Chiefs of Okut (Okat) at Okat Beach. These treaties were part of the treaty drive mounted by the British in preparation for the 1884/1885 Berlin Conference. With the treaties, the British were able to convince the other European powers that these territories were firmly under its control.

The next major historical event was the arrival of the Rev. Samuel Bill at Ibeno in December 1887 at the request of Ibeno chiefs to establish a  Christian Mission in the area. Through the establishment of the Qua Iboe Mission, Christianity and western education were brought to Ibeno, Eket, Etinan and from there Christianity and education spread to other parts of Ibibio and Ibo lands and beyond.

Next came the establishment of the Qua Iboe District in 1894 with Alfred Ashmall Whitehouse as the first Vice Consul at Eket. The district was part of the Oil Rivers Protectorate declared on June 5, 1885 after the conclusion of the Berlin Conference. This Protectorate was expanded and renamed the Niger Coast Protectorate on May 12, 1893, with Sir Claude MacDonald as its first commissioner. The Qua Iboe District comprised what is today most parts of Akwa Ibom State, including Esit Eket, Onna, Ibeno, Nsit Ubium, Etinan, Abak, Etim Ekpo, Oron, Mbo, Okobo, Urue Offong/Oruko, Udung Uko, Okobo etc. between 1893 and 1899. In 1905 Eket became a district comprising present Eket, Esit Eket, Ibeno, Onna, Oron, Mbo, Urue Offong/Oruko, Udung Uko, Okobo and part of Nsit Ubium Local Government Areas. In the 1950s Eket District came under Uyo Province in Eastern Region. In the mid 1950s Mr Keith Arrowsmith was the Divisional Officer (DO) for Eket. In his book "Bush Paths" he reported on a conversation he had with the then Premier of Eastern Region, Dr Nnamdi Azikiwe, who informed him that the first trial of county council elections in the Eastern Region of Nigeria would be conducted in Eket in 1955.

At the creation of the defunct South Eastern State on May 27, 1967, Eket became one of the 10 Divisions of the new State before additional Divisions were created in August 1970. In the 1970 exercise, Oron Division was created while Nsit Ubim was included in the new Etinan Division. Under the 1976 Local Government Reforms carried out by the Federal Government of Nigeria, Eket Division became one of the 301 Local Government Areas in the country.

During the Second Republic (October 1, 1979 – December 31, 1983), the various State Governments embarked on the creation of new local government areas. In the then Cross River State, the Government of Dr Clement Isong split Eket Local Government into five Local Government Areas, namely Eket, Uquo, Ibeno/Edor, Onnion Nung Ndem and Awa/Ikot Akpan Ntembom Local Government Areas. With the military take-over of the government on December 31, 1983, the newly created local government areas were abolished and Eket Local Government Area returned to what it was in 1976. The Military Government of Generals Ibrahim Babangida and Sanni Abachi created new local government areas in 1989, 1991 and 1996 and Eket was again split into Eket, Onna, Esit Eket and Ibeno Local Government Areas.

Economy

The abundant rivers, creeks and streams and the lush vegetation provide an enabling environment for crop, fish and animal farming. For example, cassava, various species of yams and cocoyams, vegetables, plantains, bananas, tilapia and snail farming are common. The traditional occupations of the Eket people are therefore subsistence farming, hunting, fishing and trading. However, over-farming and poor farming practices are depleting soil nutrients on many farms and plots. With the creation of states on May 27, 1967, and the commencement of Mobil operations between 1969 and 1970 which resulted in increased population in Eket, a lot of people are engaged in construction and service industries, e.g. catering and hotels management, transportation, telecommunications, merchandising (supermarkets), teaching, civil service, the professions, etc.

When Mobil Producing Nigeria started its operations in the then South Eastern State soon after the civil war, the location of Eket Local Government gave the town the advantage of being the hub of Mobil Producing Nigeria operations. Consequently, several companies providing services to Mobil were established in Eket. The Mobil Airstrip, Management Housing Estate/Mobil Guest House, Mobil Pegasus School and Mobil Technical Training Centre are located in Eket while the Qua Iboe Terminal is located at Ibeno, about 15 minutes from Eket by road. Qua River Hotels was also established by the State Government although it has now been closed down. In the late 1970s and early 1980s there were the Seastate Seafoods Ltd, the Qua Steel Products Ltd and Dr Pepper Bottling Company, all of which are now closed down. These business undertakings helped greatly to expand the economy of Eket. A private oil refinery, Amakpe International Refinery, was to be sited on the outskirts of the city along the Oron road but it is yet to materialize.

The town has a stadium as well as other infrastructure of importance, e.g. a network of tarred roads including the East-West Federal Highway which passes through the town, Eket-Etinan road, Eket-QIT Road, Eket-Jamestown Road, a telecommunications exchange, a public power transmission network, public waterworks, public and private motor parks, two urban markets (Urua Nka and Fionetok market), an abattoir, etc. It also has a number of supermarkets and hotels such as Grace Garden Apartments, Villa Marina Hotel Royalty Hotels, Crystal Palace Hotel, Roseboom Hotels, Eden Hotel, La Imperial Hotel Ltd, Olympus Hotel, Springfield Hotel, Hotel Marezi, Darells Hotel, Royalty Apartments, Sereneo Hotel, and others. Due to its industrial nature, Eket is a relatively expensive city.

Many of the internal roads and drainage systems in the town were constructed or rehabilitated by Mobil Producing Nigeria under its Community Development program. However, with the advent of NDDC the company was compelled by law to contribute to the funding of the Niger Delta Development Commission (NDDC) thereby curtailing its community development efforts. The State Government has embarked on a major drainage project along Atabong Road and is in the process of upgrading infrastructure in the town with the rehabilitation of major roads including Atabong Road, Eket-QIT Road, Idua Road, etc., the rehabilitation of the Stadium and Urua Nka, and the construction of housing estates. Eket is a cosmopolitan town with several gated estates, including Usua Amanam Estate, Ikot Ibiok; Esa Akpan Estate, Atabong; Uwa Estate, Ikot Ibiok and Stevegrad Estate, RCC Road. There is a Federal Low Cost Housing Estate at Mkpok and State Low Cost Housing Estates at Ikot Udoma and Okon.

Banking business thrives in Eket due to the increased economic activities in the town. Currently First Bank, UBA, Union Bank, FCMB, Ecobank, Fidelity Bank, etc. operate in Eket. There are three main markets in the town, namely, Urua Nka, Fiongetok Market and Udoinyang Market. In recent times, a thriving foodstuff market has been established along Marina Road where agricultural products from the Northern part of the country are sold. There is also a standard abattoir at Ikot Ebok village. Eket also has a Mother's Babies home at Idong Iniang, Eket.

In the 1990s, western environmentalists were concerned over the activities of oil exploitation in and around Eket, such as Shell and Mobil. The area is now newly "oil-rich" and Eket is the thriving hub of a new oil and gas business, with more than 250 companies providing support services such as catering, flights, and exports. However, this success has caused problems, especially a reluctance by local young men to engage in traditional work such as fishing and farming. There are vocal local campaigns to increase the percentage of oil revenue that is given to the local community.

People

The Eket or Ekid are the people who live in this Local Government Area.  They are a sub-group of the Ibibio people. Eket is also the name of the main sub-language that they speak, a Benue–Congo language. Both languages are similar, but sufficiently distinct to give away the precise district the speaker originates from.

The Eket have a form of caste or class society, with the "Amama" being the highest caste, and these are notable for undertaking traditional potlatch-like feasts in which the poorer people are fed en masse. In addition to the Amama, groups of "Ekpenim Isong" (Ekpo Ndem Isong in Ibibio) class rule individual villages and towns, and their will is enforced by the "Ikan" class (traditional masked police) to which entry is by merit rather than birth.

Common surnames include Odungide, Akanimo, Assam, Inwang, Essiet, Udoito, Edoho, Edohoeket, Etukudo, Ukpong, Abia, Ekpo, Ikott, Abasekong, Asamudo, Nyoho, Ekong, Ekanim, Udofa, Edem, Inyang, Itauma, Udosen, Usoro, Etti, Etteh (actually meaning father), Udofia, Ukoetuk, Uku, Abia and Nsien. Just like the remainder of West Africa, the family name normally is an indicator of which specific region one is from.

Education 

Due to the advent of Christianity in Eket towards the end of the 19th century and the activities of European traders, Western education came to Eket early. However, the first Primary School was the Government Primary School, Hospital Road, Eket which was established in 1905. According to Chief J.B. Adiakpan, the Grace Bill Institute, Afaha Eket was set up in 1916 by Miss Ema Bill daughter of the Rev. Samuel Bill as a Home for the training of girls. It became Grace Bill Memorial Institute after the death of Mrs Grace Bill and finally Grace Bill Institute. It was approved by the government in 1931. The institute later became the Qua Iboe Church Teacher Training College, Afaha Eket before the civil war. However, although Qua Iboe Church set up several primary schools in the area for the training of teachers and clerks, secondary schools were not established in Eket until the 1960s. Eket people had to send their children to secondary schools outside Eket, e.g. Etinan Institute, Etinan, Methodist Boys' High School, Oron, Hope Wadell Training Institution, Calabar and St Patrick's College, Calabar or to schools outside Calabar Province. The first secondary schools to be established in Eket were St Francis Secondary School, Ikot Ataku/Ikot Akpandem established by the Catholic Church in 1962 and Edoho Memorial Grammar School, Ikot Usoekong founded in 1962 by the late Chief D.J. Edoho, commissioner for Uyo Province.  After the liberation of Eket by the Nigerian Federal Forces in 1968 the QIC TTC, Afaha Eket was moved to QIC TTC, Ndon Eyo so that its premises could become the premises of Edoho Memoral Grammar School whose name was now changed to Government Secondary School, Afaha Eket while the former premises of Edoho Memorial Grammar School, Ikot Usoekong was taken over by the Nigerian Army.

In the 1970s and 1980s several communities, individuals and organizations established secondary schools in Eket to provide education for the increased population of the town. Such schools include Community Secondary Commercial School, Ikot Usoekong (1977), Girls High School, Ikot Ibiok (established in 1983 by the Eket Women Development Association), Nduo Eduo High School, Nduo Eduo, Community Secondary School, Idong Iniang (1982), CDA Secondary School, Iko Eket, Community Secondary School, Odio and Apostolic Church Secondary School, Esit Urua. The town has a number of private secondary schools and about 90 Private Nursery/Primary Schools. A few of such schools are: Excellent Comprehensive Secondary School, Dayspring School, Hope Power International School, Ideal Preparatory School, Wills' Secondary Commercial School, Alex Secondary Commercial School, Bilson Secondary Commercial School, Pegasus  Schools owned by Mobil Producing Nigeria, All-Weather International Nursery/Primary School, New Era International School, Aunty Chinny's International School, Divine Seeds Schools, Adiaha Obong Nursery/Primary School, Nobel's Nursery/Primary School, Ideal Nursery/Primary School, Abraham Memorial Nursery/Primary School, Apostolic Church Nursery/Primary School, Qua Iboe Church Nursery School, etc.

The only post-secondary educational institution in the Local Government Area is the privately owned Heritage Polytechnic owned by Dr Emmanuel Ekot, a Chemical Engineer. The school started in 2000 as Heritage College but in 2010 it was licensed by the National Board for Technical Education (NBTE) to operate as a Polytechnic. It is located at Ikot Udota, off Eket-Oron Road. The Mass Communication Department of the Polytechnic operates the Heritage Radio, Eket. There is also the School of Nursing attached to Immanuel Hospital, Eket, run by the Akwa Ibom State Ministry of Health for the training of Nurses. Mobil Producing Nigeria also runs a Technical Training Centre (TTC) for the training of technicians for the oil and gas industry.

Health care 

The iconic Immanuel General Hospital is the main public hospital in Eket. It was established by the Lutheran Mission in 1953 and the Rev. Dr. Karl Kurth, the executive secretary of the Syndical Conference Missionary Board of North America officially opened the hospital and dedicated it to the glory of God in a special service on May 2, 1953, although the corner-stone laying ceremony was performed on 20 June 1951 with the participation of Sir John Stuart Macpherson, K.C.M.G., Governor-General of Nigeria. The 218-bed hospital is now owned and run by the Akwa Ibom State Ministry of Health which in 2020 commissioned the re-modeled and re-equipped Immanuel General Hospital. There is also a Psychiatric Hospital and a School of Nursing run by the State Ministry of Health.

There is a Government owned Polyclinic on Hospital Road and Health Centres at Idong Iniang, Okon, Efoi, Nduo Eduo, Idua, Ikot Ebok, Afaha Atai, Ebana, Esit Urua, Iko Eket, Ikot Usoekong, Odio, Ikot Ukpong, Ikot Abasi (Okon), Ikot Abia, Ikot Okudomo. The former Minister of Health, Senator Helen Esuene, facilitated the establishment of a Health Centre at Mkpok. Eket is blessed with a good number of private clinics which provide high quality medical services to the people. The first of such clinics was Riviera Klinic which was established by the late Dr. U.E. Umoekuk in the 1970s. The hospital has since ceased to exist. Others are Samaritan Hospital, Afaha Uqua owned by Dr Nnah Etukudo,  Redemption Clinic, Marina Road, Carmella Hospital, Afia Nsit, Holifield Hospital, RCC Road, Nduye Medical Services, Ekpene Ukpa Street, Assurance Medical Centre, Abasiekeme Specialist Clinic and Maternity, Good Sheperd Hospital, Eket-Oron Road, Iha Foundation Medical Centre, Ikot Ebok, Goodcare Medial Centre, Utibe Abasi Clinic, Trinity Clinic, Bethany Medical Centre, Solution Clinic & Maternity, Caleb Medical Centre, Cozar Specialist Hospital, Afia Nsit, Victory Medical Centre, Ikot Usoekong, Romivic Specialist Hospital, St. Polycarp Medical Clinic, Wills Memorial Medical Centre, Amado Medical Centre and many others. There are also dentists, opticians and optometrists practising in Eket.

Clans that constitute Ekid

Notable people

Eket has produced numerous prominent men and women who have made their marks as traditional or community rulers, public administrators, business men and women, entrepreneurs, scholars or academics, etc.

Chief Paul Bassey, Atabong – Project Consultant, Mobil Track and Field Competition; chairman, Akwa United FC, Uyo; sports editor, Nigerian Chronicles, Punch Newspaper, Champion Newspaper, etc.; founder, "Today Sports"
Late Mr Samuel Bassey, Assang, Eket – former secretary, Nigeria Produce Marketing Company and the Amalgamated Associated Company; former secretary, Municipal and Local Government Workers Union which became the National Union of Local Government Employers; former Secretary All-Nigeria Trade Union; former general secretary, Nigerian Trade Union Congress (NTUC); Signatory of the Apena Declaration of Trade Union Unit which laid the foundation for the formation of the Nigeria Labour Congress (NLC); First Chairman of Eket Local Government Council after the 1976 Local Government Reforms; former member, Federal House Representatives (elected under the National Party of Nigeria – NPN);
Senator Eme Ufot Ekaette, Nduo Eduo – manager, Pharmacy at NNPC; Chief Pharmacist,  Military Hospital, Lagos; managing director at Safi Pharmacy; board member of the Universal Basic Education Commission (UBEC); director, Union Bank Plc; member, International Federation of Pharmacists; member, West African Pharmaceutical Federation; first female president of the Pharmaceutical Association of Nigeria (1977); senator of the Federal Republic representing Akwa Ibom South Senatorial District (Eket Senatorial District) under the Peoples Democratic Party (PDP).
Chief Nduese Essien, Ikot Ibiok – former two-time Member of the Federal House of Representatives (1999–2007; Leader of the South-South Caucus of the House of Representatives; chairman of the House Committee on Anti-Corruption, National Ethics and Values; chairman of the Nigerian Chapter of the African Parliamentarians Network against Corruption (NIPNAC); former Minister of Housing and Rural Development; founder/managing director, Student Care Services Ltd, Calabar/Uyo; chairman/managing director, Kefam Nigeria Ltd, Eket.
Senator Helen Esuene, Atai Ndon Afaha Eket – secretary, Eket Local Government; member, Constituent Assembly; former Minister of State for Health; former Minister of Housing & Urban Development; chairman/managing director, Villa Marina Hotels Ltd; managing director, Grafen Enterprises Nigeria Ltd.
Brig-General Uduokaha Esuene, Atai Ndon Afaha Eket - A retired general of the Nigerian Air Force, Attah of Ekid, first Military Governor of the defunct South Eastern State (now Cross River State from where Akwa Ibom State was created) (May 27, 1967 to July 29, 1975), Chairman of Champion Breweries, Uyo, gubernatorial candidate of the Unity Party of Nigeria (UPN) in the 1983 Cross River State Gubernatorial Election, presidential candidate of the Social Democratic Party (Nigeria) (SDP) in the 1993 Nigeria Presidential Election. He was the spouse of Senator Helen Esuene. The U.J. Esuene Stadium in Calabar, Cross River State is named after him as is the Esuene Sports Club in Eket, Akwa Ibom State
His Eminence Dr Sunday Mbang, CON, Idua Eket – Prelate Emeritus, Methodist Church Nigeria former Chairman, Christian Association of Nigeria (CAN); former President, World Methodist Council of Churches; former Chairman, Christian Council of Nigeria; author of the books My  Life & Times, a Memoir (Olusegun Obasanjo Presidential Library Foundation, Abeokuta, 2021) and The Unchanging World and the Unchanging God (Daystar, Ibadan, 1983), from 1999 co-chaired the Nigerian Inter-religious Council (NIIRC) with His Eminence, Alhaji Muhammadu Maccido, CFR, the late sultan of Sokoto, the then president general, Nigerian Supreme Council for Islamic Affairs (NSCIA); member, board of trustees, Ritman University, Ikot Ekpene.

References

External links
Wikimapia
Eket wood sculpture
Eket masks

Cities in Akwa Ibom State
Local Government Areas in Akwa Ibom State
Ethnic groups in Nigeria